The 1844 Pennsylvania gubernatorial election occurred on October 9, 1844. Incumbent Democratic  governor David R. Porter was not a candidate for re-election. Democratic candidate Francis R. Shunk defeated Whig candidate Joseph Markle to become Governor of Pennsylvania. This was the last time until 2022 that Democrats won more than two gubernatorial elections in a row in Pennsylvania.

Results

References

1844
Pennsylvania
Gubernatorial
November 1844 events